The Spačva basin is a geographic microregion in eastern Croatia and northwest Serbia. The region is located in the south-western part of Syrmia—the latter being divided by Croatia and Serbia—and the southeastern part of Slavonia macroregion of Croatia, surrounding the Spačva river and the Studva river. The entire region is 51.000 hectares big out of which 40.000 is located in Croatia and 11.000 in Serbia.

The region's 40.000 hectares of oak (Quercus robur) forests makes Spačva basin one of the largest continuous lowland oak forests in Europe. Up until the 1935 regulation of the bank of the Sava river the entire region was regularly flooded in spring.

In addition, the region forms an organic continuum with the Bosutska šuma literally Bosut Forest in Vojvodina in Serbia. Bosutska šuma is one of two strict nature reserves in Vojvodina. Spačva basin and Bosutska šuma form the northern section of forest and swampland complex spreading south of the Sava river as well where it is known as the Donje Podrinje in Bosnia and Herzegovina and Central Serbia.

Wood industry based in Spačva basin is an important natural resource in the economic output of the Vukovar-Syrmia County. The industrial exploitation of the forest was initiated in the XIX century at the time of Slavonian Military Frontier. The major settlement in the region is the town of Otok.

Gallery

See also
Geography of Croatia
Kopački Rit
Historical Palača Swamp of the Bobota Canal
Lonjsko Polje and Jelas-polje
Gornje Podunavlje and Tikvara in Vojvodina
Danube–Tisza Interfluve and Danube-Drava National Park in Hungary
Ramsar Convention

References

External links
Bird-watching Center Nijemci

Regions of Croatia
Syrmia
Geography of Vukovar-Syrmia County
Geographical regions of Serbia
Croatia–Serbia border
Šid